Benjamin M. Coates (September 8, 1819 – August 26, 1880) was an American miner, businessman, and politician. He served two terms in the Wisconsin State Assembly.

Biography
Born in New Harmony, Indiana, Coates moved as a young man to Platteville, Wisconsin, where he became involved in lead mining.

He moved to California in 1849 as part of the gold rush and returned to Wisconsin in 1853. He operated a linseed mill and was in the merchandise business. In 1863, he moved to Boscobel, Wisconsin, where he went into banking.

Coates entered politics and was elected to the Wisconsin State Assembly, serving in 1869 and 1875. He was a Republican.

He died in Boscobel, Wisconsin.

Notes

External links
 

1819 births
1880 deaths
People from New Harmony, Indiana
People from Boscobel, Wisconsin
Businesspeople from Wisconsin
Members of the Wisconsin State Assembly
19th-century American politicians
19th-century American businesspeople